The Prom Ballroom was a dance hall in Saint Paul, Minnesota, United States, which opened in 1941 with a performance by Glenn Miller.  The club played a diverse array of acts, ranging from rock to polka and jazz, and included acts like Count Basie and Lawrence Welk.  The house orchestra was called the Jules Herman Orchestra.  The infamous and ill-fated "Winter Dance Party" was the attraction on January 28, 1959.

The Prom Ballroom was located at 1190 University Avenue West.  It was torn down in 1987.

References

External links

 Minnewiki
 Prom Ballroom photos at the Minnesota Historical Society

Former music venues in the United States
Minnesota culture
Music venues in Minnesota
Demolished buildings and structures in Minnesota
Buildings and structures demolished in 1987